Norden is a railway station located in Norden, Lower Saxony, Germany. The station lies on the Emsland Railway (Rheine - Norddeich) and the train services are operated by Deutsche Bahn. The Küstenbahn Ostfriesland steam train operates on Sundays from June to October to Dornum.

Train services
The station is served by the following service(s):

Intercity services (IC/EC ): Norddeich - Emden - Münster - Düsseldorf - Köln - Bonn - Koblenz - Mainz - Mannheim - Stuttgart
Intercity services (IC ): Norddeich - Emden - Münster - Düsseldorf - Köln - Bonn - Koblenz - Mainz - Mannheim - Karlsruhe - Konstanz
Intercity services (IC ): Norddeich - Emden - Bremen - Hanover - Braunschweig - Magdeburg - Leipzig
Regional services : Norddeich - Emden - Leer - Oldenburg - Bremen - Nienburg - Hanover

References

Railway stations in Lower Saxony
Railway stations in Germany opened in 1883